Oosterschelde National Park is a national park in the Dutch province of Zeeland.

This national park was established on 8 May 2002. It comprises the Eastern Scheldt (Dutch: Oosterschelde), Keeten-Mastgat, Krabbenkreek, Zijpe, Slaak, and Krammer. The Eastern Scheldt part behind the Oesterdam doesn't belong to the national park.

Oosterschelde National Park is surrounded by the following regions: Schouwen-Duiveland, Tholen, Zuid-Beveland, and Noord-Beveland.

The Zeeland Bridge crosses the national park.

See also 
 Eastern Scheldt

External links 
 Official website

Protected areas established in 2002
2002 establishments in the Netherlands
Ramsar sites in the Netherlands
National parks of the Netherlands
Parks in Zeeland
Tourist attractions in Zeeland
Goes
Kapelle
Noord-Beveland
Reimerswaal (municipality)
Schouwen-Duiveland
Tholen
Zuid-Beveland